Drillia athyrma is a species of sea snail, a marine gastropod mollusc in the family Drilliidae.

Description
The length of the shell attains 13 mm, its diameter 4.5 mm.

The buff-colored shell is turriculated, with an elevated spire with 10 whorls. The oblique, acute, longitudinal ribs and the incrassate, subventricose, upper whorls seem characteristic. The body whorl contains about 12 ribs. The aperture is oval. The white columella is smooth. The siphonal canal is very short.

Distribution
This species occurs in the demersal zone of the Gulf of Oman

References

 Melvill & Standen (1901) Mollusks from the Persian Gulf and Arabian Sea; Proceedings of the Zoological Society of London.  v. 2, 1901

External links
 

athyrma
Gastropods described in 1901